Loris Paoluzzi (born 14 March 1974) is an Italian retired male hammer thrower, which participated at the 1999 and 2001 World Championships in Athletics.

Biography
His personal best throw was 80.98 metres, achieved in July 1999 in Pescara.

Achievements

See also
 Italian all-time top lists - Hammer throw

References

External links
 

1974 births
Living people
Italian male hammer throwers
Athletes (track and field) at the 1996 Summer Olympics
Athletes (track and field) at the 2000 Summer Olympics
Olympic athletes of Italy
World Athletics Championships athletes for Italy
Athletics competitors of Fiamme Azzurre